The Banking Ordinance is a set of laws passed by the Legislative Council of Hong Kong to tighten restrictions for opening up or licensing a bank.  Prior to the 1964 re-regulations, the government had no way to control bank's monetary effect on the economy.  It also had no way of protecting the people utilizing the institutions.  Banking was considered a Laissez-faire network, and was also described as "Free Banking" or "Wildcat Banking" filled with much uncertainty.

History

Banking Ordinance of 1948
The first law passed.  It provided for the licensing of banks, examination of bank books, publication of bank statements and the appointment of an advisory committee.  A Hong Kong dollar $5,000 license fee was required one-time.  Afterwards, a bank could theoretically open on zero capital.

Banking Ordinance of 1964
The law was passed on 16 October 1964 and advised by a group of senior officials from the Bank of England.  A minimum capital of HKD $5 million and liquidity ratio of 25% and limitation on loans and investments became the new requirements to open a legit institution.

Banking Ordinance of 1967
The law was passed in response to a banking crisis in which a few banks experienced liquidity problems and 18 acquisitions by larger banks were recorded.  The revised law set the new minimum capital to HKD $10 million.  A debt moratorium was imposed on new bank licenses.

Hong Kong Association of Banks
The Hong Kong Association of Banks was established in 1981 as a network tag for banks that follow the ordinance rules.

Banking Ordinance of 1986
The law is an enhancement to the existing 1967 set.  Changes were made to the provisioning of banks, adequacy of capital, control of the management of a bank.  It also merged the "Deposit-taking Companies Ordinance" which also required a certain capital before banks can accept deposits.

See also
 Exchange Bank Association

References

History of Hong Kong
1904 in law
1964 in law
1967 in law
1986 in law
Hong Kong legislation
Banking in Hong Kong